Enis Bećirbegović (born 2 August 1976) is a Bosnian alpine skier. He competed at the 1992 Winter Olympics, representing Yugoslavia, and at the 1994, 1998 and the 2002 Winter Olympics, representing Bosnia and Herzegovina.

References

External links
 

1976 births
Living people
Bosnia and Herzegovina male alpine skiers
Olympic alpine skiers of Yugoslavia
Olympic alpine skiers of Bosnia and Herzegovina
Alpine skiers at the 1992 Winter Olympics
Alpine skiers at the 1994 Winter Olympics
Alpine skiers at the 1998 Winter Olympics
Alpine skiers at the 2002 Winter Olympics
Sportspeople from Sarajevo